Festa di laurea, internationally released as Graduation Party, is a 1985 Italian drama film directed by Pupi Avati. For his  soundtrack Riz Ortolani won a Nastro d'Argento for Best Score.

Plot  
Romagna countryside, 1950, near the sea. The baker Vanni Porelli is commissioned to organize the graduation party of Mrs. Gaia's daughter in a dilapidated abandoned farmhouse. The work is difficult and the woman refuses to pay even an advance, but Vanni accepts, because ten years earlier, on the occasion of the 1940 declaration of war, he had been kissed by surprise by Gaia, with whose family the mother of him, and had been naively in love with him so much that he ended up separating from his wife.

Vanni gets to work, helped by his son Nicola, by two orphans adopted by his wife, by some evacuees who had illegally occupied the farmhouse and by other occasional collaborators. The party ends in disaster, totally disorganized and inadequate to Gaia's demands: in the end the man even refuses to be paid. The party remains a modest amateur film shot by the lawyer of the town.

Cast 
Carlo Delle Piane as Vanni Porelli	
Aurore Clément as  Gaia		
Lidia Broccolino as  Sandra		
Nik Novecento as  Nicola Porelli
Fiorenza Tessari

See also   
 List of Italian films of 1985

References

External links

1985 films
Italian drama films
Films set in 1950
Films directed by Pupi Avati
Films scored by Riz Ortolani
Films set in Emilia-Romagna
1980s Italian-language films
1980s Italian films